Ric Schafer (born 1951) is a retired American ice hockey player and head coach best remembered for his time with the men's program at Notre Dame.

Career
Schafer was one of many Minnesota players brought to South Bend under Lefty Smith. When he started play for the Fighting Irish the NCAA had just removed its restriction on freshman playing for varsity teams which allowed Schafer to earn four letters with the team as well as serve as team captain his senior season.

After graduating Schafer returned to Notre Dame as an assistant in 1975 and worked in that capacity until 1980. At the same time that Notre Dame was experiencing a budgetary issue with its program Alaska-Fairbanks was elevating its club to Division I status and they chose Schafer to be their new head coach.

At the start Alaska-Fairbanks was a bad team. Schafer was only able to guide them to one win at the top level their first season and four more the following campaign. By the third year, however, the team turned their fortunes around and produced a 19-7 record. The Nanooks posted two consecutive 20+ win seasons in the mid-1980s before the team joined its first conference, the Great West Hockey Conference. Schafer got his team a second place finish the first year of conference play but was unable to improve on that mark before his former coach Lefty Smith retired and he accepted the head coaching post at his alma mater.

When Schafer took over Notre Dame's program in 1987 the team was in turmoil, having drastically slashed its recruiting budget and eliminated all hockey scholarships. While technically a Division I Independent at the time Notre Dame was playing against mostly Division III teams which was the main cause for its 27-4-2 record and ACHA Tournament Championship in Schafer's first year with the team. The team's fortunes declined when the ACHA collapsed the following year but Schafer was able to hold the program together through the rough patch.

By 1992 enough interest in the team had been generated to warrant the administration returning some scholarships to the program and Notre Dame was readmitted to the CCHA. Unfortunately the stigma from downgrading its program stuck with the Fighting Irish and Schafer was unable to bring in many top recruits. Notre Dame finished near the bottom of the league standings for three straight seasons and in 1995 he was relieved of his coaching duties.

Head coaching record

References

1951 births
Living people
American ice hockey coaches
Notre Dame Fighting Irish men's ice hockey players
Notre Dame Fighting Irish ice hockey coaches
Alaska Nanooks men's ice hockey coaches
Ice hockey coaches from Minnesota
People from New Brighton, Minnesota
Ice hockey players from Minnesota